The 1964–65 Divizia A was the forty-seventh season of Divizia A, the top-level football league of Romania.

Teams

League table

Results

Positions by round

Top goalscorers

Champion squad

See also 

 1964–65 Divizia B
 1964–65 Divizia C

References

Liga I seasons
Romania
1964–65 in Romanian football